Małkowski (masculine) or Małkowska (feminine) may refer to
Małkowski (surname)
Wola Malkowska, a village in Poland
Rainer-Malkowski-Preis, a literary prize in Germany

See also